The Manila Railway 70 class of 1908 were at least twenty 0-6-2 combination side- and well-tank locomotives built by the North British Locomotive Company. It was first operated as mainline locomotives in the late 1900s and early 1910s by the Manila Railway Company, primarily to support its growing network and replace the aging Dagupan class engines. They were used on all the lines of the networks of both the Manila Railway and its succeeding incarnation, the Manila Railroad. Since the 1920s, some locomotives were retired then either scrapped or given to sugarcane plantations. The last unit, No. 79, survived with the Pampanga Sugar Development Company as late as 1989.

Background
Two Glasgow-based locomotive manufacturers previously built 30 tank locomotives for the newly-formed Manila Railway Company in 1888. These were Neilson & Company, maker of the A subclass and numbered 1 to 15, and Dübs & Company, maker of the B subclass and numbered 16 to 30. These were known to local railroad historians as the Dagupan class.

These two companies then merged with Sharp, Stewart & Company and formed the North British Locomotive Company (NBL) in 1903. In 1906, the newly-formed NBL built the Manila Railway 100 class tender locomotives under the designs of Horace L. Higgins, the sole general manager of the Manila Railway.

The 1900s also sought the increase of several branch lines to the north of the Pasig River including the Antipolo line, infamous for its steep gradients which limited the trains' speed. While the 100 class took the flagship express train services on the PNR North Main Line, the Dagupan class were still hauling both regular passenger and freight services. This is due to the 100 class' relatively small fleet of only five locomotives. However, the Dagupan class also started to show its age with these locomotives already approaching 20 years old at the time. For this reason, Higgins ordered additional 0-6-2 Branchliner type tank locomotives from NBL in 1906. However, construction and entrance to service was delayed to 1908.

Design
As with the Dagupan class, the 70 class had a combination of side and well tanks being made for mainline services of the era. The 70 class is distinguished from the former with a slimmer smokestack and a more solid cab. The design was also reported to be faster and can carry heavier loads than its predecessor.

While its livery is fully black during its term with the Manila Railway and Manila Railroad, its cab and side tanks were painted orange during its service with Pasudeco.

Service
The locomotives were first introduced in 1908 throughout the entire Manila Railway/Railroad network and ushered the eventual retirement of the Dagupan class. In 1910, No. 84 was introduced into service on the Antipolo line.

Relegation and retirement
As with the other old tank locomotives built by the British, the arrival of larger American-built locomotives in the 1920s rendered the class obsolete for mainline services. They still continued serving the new Manila Railroad well into the 1930s as a switcher or on the remaining services on the Antipolo line after the 160 and 300 classes were transferred to new branch lines after a 1916 Supreme Court of the Philippines ruling. The class was already retired by 1947 since it was not given a letter classification by the MRR's Mechanical Department. By 1952, Nos. 79, 90 and 92 were stored in Tutuban.

Long after dieselization in 1956, No. 92, the last known unit to be preserved in MRR was awaiting its fate in Tutuban by 1960 hoping to be preserved longer but was scrapped in 1961 at the MRR Caloocan Shops.

Pasudeco
Pasudeco acquired No. 79 and it was occasionally given an accompanying Slopeback tender if their Baldwin-built No. 2 did not work. The unit survived until 1989, though rather in a derelict state. It remains unknown if No. 79 is the second of two steam locomotives reported by Kautzor (2006) to have survived in their facilities due to its former railyard being off-limits, the first being Baldwin-built No. 2, a 2-6-0 tender locomotive now on display in a shopping mall in Marikina. Otherwise, it is most likely been scrapped in the 1990s.

References

NBL locomotives
Rolling stock of the Philippines
0-6-2T locomotives